Bashu can refer to:

 Bashu, the Little Stranger
 Bashu or Ba-Shu, a region associated with modern-day Chongqing and Sichuan, named due to the ancient Chinese state of Ba and the Kingdom of Shu during the Shang and Zhou dynasties
 Ba-Shu Chinese, also known as Old Sichuanese, an extinct Sinitic (Chinese) language spoken in Sichuan
 Bashu Secondary School, located in Yuzhong District, Chongqing, China

See also
 Ba (state)
 Shu (kingdom)
 Bashundhara (disambiguation) 
 Bashuki
 Bashur
 Alain Bashung